Jagdish Chandra Mahindra commonly referred as  J. C. Mahindra (c 1892–1951) was an Indian industrialist and co-founder of Mahindra & Mahindra in 1945, with Kailash Chandra Mahindra and Malik Ghulam Mohammed. He is the grandfather of Anand Mahindra, the present Chairman of Mahindra Group.

Early life and education
Born in a Sikh family in Ludhiana, Punjab, India, he was the eldest of nine children. The loss of his father at an early age placed the responsibility for the family on his shoulders. He believed strongly in the power of education and ensured that all his brothers and sisters studied hard. He sent his brother K. C. to Cambridge.

Mahindra received his degree from Victoria Jubilee Technological Institute (VJTI) Bombay (University of Bombay), one of India's premier engineering and technical institutes.

Career
Mahindra started out his career with Tata Steel, serving as the senior Sales Manager from 1929 to 1940.  When the steel industry became critical during World War II, the Government of India appointed him as the first Steel Controller of India.

Mahindra & Mahindra

J. C. Mahindra and K. C. Mahindra joined forces with Ghulam Mohammed and started Mahindra & Mohammed as a steel company in Bombay.  Two years later, India gained its independence, Ghulam Mohammed left the company to become Pakistan’s first finance minister, and the Mahindra brothers started to manufacture Willys jeeps in Bombay. Soon, the company’s name was changed to Mahindra & Mahindra.

Death
Mahindra died of a heart attack in 1951.

References

External links
 J.C. Mahindra Biography at Official Website of Mahindra & Mahindra 
 J.C. Mahindra and an independent India began their rise together 

1892 births
1951 deaths
Indian billionaires
Businesspeople from Ludhiana
Punjabi people
Mahindra Group
University of Mumbai alumni
20th-century Indian businesspeople
Indian industrialists
Indian founders of automobile manufacturers